Ek Tha Rusty is a Doordarshan show based on the stories of writer Ruskin Bond, broadcast in 1995 (season 1), 2012-2013 (season 2) and 2014-2015 (season 3).

Produced and directed by Shubhadarshini Singh, the show starred Zarul- , Nadira, Pankaj Berry, Raj Zutshi, Ayub Khan, Vipul Gupta, Bhanu Uday, Suhasini Mulay. For seasons 2 and 3, actors Vipul Gupta and Bhanu Uday played the role of grown up Rusty.

Ruskin Bond, the author of Rusty and other short stories for children presented seasons 2 and 3 of the show and appeared in the beginning and end of each episode. The series was semi-autobiographical, as many of the stories adapted were incidents and experiences from Ruskin Bond's life.

a

Synopsis 
Season 1, aired in 1995, was about a ten-year-old boy Rusty, his life at a boarding school and his friends, family in Dehradun. This season was set in 1930s, when India was under British rule.

Season 2 shows the time when Rusty is about 30 years of age and a struggling writer. It is set in 1960s, when Rusty has returned from England, to live in Mulberry Cottage, Mussoorie. Season 2 had Vipul Gupta playing a 30 years old Rusty. It included ten of Bond's stories - Love is a sad song, Sensualist, Dead Man's Gift, Last Time I saw Delhi, Hanging at Mango, Who Killed the Rani?, Dead Man's Gift, Binya Passes By, Last Time I Saw Delhi, From Small Beginnings and At Greens Hotel, along with his novel Maharani. It was shot in Mussoorie and Dehradun.

Season 3 had Bhanu Uday playing a 35 years old Rusty. It included Bond’s stories - The Sensualist, Time Stops at Shamli and Shooting at Mango Top. The show was shot in Mussoorie. Bond’s granddaughter (from his adopted family in Mussoorie) Shristi, also acted in the show.

Set in 1960s Ek tha Rusty Seasons 2 and 3 are shot in the beautiful woods and snowy hills, where alongside interesting stories, some of beautiful tracks are also featured; including "Hawaon ki dhun and Zindagi keraye ka ghar hai".

References 

DD National original programming
1995 Indian television series debuts
Television shows set in the British Raj
Television shows set in Uttarakhand
2015 Indian television series endings
Television shows based on Indian novels